CKSX-FM is a community radio station which broadcasts on the frequency of 91.1 MHz FM in Sioux Narrows, Ontario, Canada.

The station is owned by The Corporation of the Township of Sioux Narrows-Nestor Falls. It airs Radio Paradise throughout the day with hourly announcements of current time & weather conditions. though the township government utilizes the station for emergency announcements when needed.

References

External links 
 Township of Sioux Narrows - Nestor Falls
 

KSX
KSX
Year of establishment missing